Harald Bergseth (11 July 1923 – 28 April 2012) was a Norwegian soil scientist.

He hailed from Gudbrandsdalen. He took his master's degree in physical geography at the University of Oslo, later another degree in physical chemistry as well as the dr.agric. degree. He was a professor in soil science at the Norwegian College of Agriculture until the age of 71, later professor emeritus. He was a fellow of the Norwegian Academy of Science and Letters. He resided in Ås and died in April 2012.

References

1923 births
2012 deaths
People from Oppland
University of Oslo alumni
Academic staff of the Norwegian College of Agriculture
Norwegian chemists
Norwegian soil scientists
Members of the Norwegian Academy of Science and Letters
People from Ås, Akershus